Spinirta is a genus of east Asian corinnid sac spiders. It was first described by C. Jin and F. Zhang in 2020, and it has only been found in China.

Species
 it contains ten species:
S. aurita Jin & Zhang, 2020 – China
S. aviforma Jin & Zhang, 2020 – China
S. forcipata Jin & Zhang, 2020 – China
S. jinyunshanensis Jin & Zhang, 2020 – China
S. leigongshanensis Jin & Zhang, 2020 – China
S. qiaoliaoensis (Lu & Chen, 2019) – China
S. qizimeiensis Jin & Zhang, 2020 – China
S. quadrata Jin & Zhang, 2020 – China
S. rugosa Jin & Zhang, 2020 – China
S. sparsula Jin & Zhang, 2020 – China

See also
 Allomedmassa
 List of Corinnidae species

References

Further reading

Corinnidae genera
Spiders of China